Kidane, is a word in various Ethiopian Semitic languages that translates to covenant or vow. It is also a common male name in Ethiopia and Eritrea

People with the name 
Kidane is used as a given name in Eritrea and Ethiopia.

Abraham Kidane, the Senior Economic Advisor to the Government of Eritrea and to the Ministry of National Development
Azazet Habtezghi Kidane, Eritrean-British nurse working with refugees in Israel
 Daniel Kidane (born 1986), British composer
Etalemahu Kidane (born 1983), Ethiopian long-distance runner who specializes in the 3000 metres
Kidane Tadasse (born 1987), Eritrean long-distance runner who specializes in the 5000 metres and 10,000 metres
Kidane Wedi Qeshi, Eritrean Government Official
Kidane-Mariam Teklehaimanot (1933–2009), Ethiopian Roman Catholic prelate
Saba Kidane (born 1978), Eritrean poet
Simon Kidane (born 1975), Ethiopian basketball player
Tekle Kidane (born 1939), former football player
Werknesh Kidane (born 1981), Ethiopian long-distance track and field athlete running both 5000 and 10,000 metres

Other uses 
Kidane may also refer to:
 Ura Kidane Mehret, an Ethiopian Orthodox Church located on the Zege peninsula in Lake Tana of Ethiopia

See also 
 Habesha name

Amharic-language names